Herlincourt is a commune in the Pas-de-Calais department in the Hauts-de-France region of France.

Geography

Population

Places of interest
 The church of St. Croix, dating from the seventeenth century.
 The chateau, dating from the eighteenth century.
 Traces of an old castle.

See also
 Communes of the Pas-de-Calais department

References

Communes of Pas-de-Calais